Dinara Safina and Katarina Srebotnik were the defending champions, but neither chose to participate that year.

Cara Black and Liezel Huber won the title, defeating Elena Likhovtseva and Elena Vesnina in the final 7–5, 4–6, 6–1.

Seeds

 Cara Black Liezel Huber (champions)
 Nathalie Dechy Vera Zvonareva (semifinals)
 Janette Husárová Květa Peschke (semifinals)
 Elena Likhovtseva Elena Vesnina (final)

Draw

Draw

Notes
The winners will receive $27,730 and 275 ranking points.
The runners-up will receive $14,900 and 190 ranking points.
The last direct acceptance team was Leslie Butkiewicz/Debbrich Feys (combined ranking of 700).
The player representative was Martina Müller.

Diamond Games
2007 WTA Tour